The Promenade of the Naval Heroes is a public park located in the historic centre of Lima. It occupies the first block of the Paseo de la República. It was given its current name on October 8, 1979 in commemoration of the centenary of the battle of Angamos.

History
The square was built in the 1920s during the government of President Augusto B. Leguía and since then it has been the scene of some of the largest social demonstrations in the country. Starting in the 1990s, political rallies leading up to elections have been held on the Paseo. The square along with the first meters of the Paseo de la República expressway have also been used for the organization of automobile events.

In June 2007, work began for the construction of the  that articulates the authorized lines that provide public transport service on the express roads of Paseo de la República and  within the Metropolitan transport system that connects the districts of Comas and Chorrillos. The project, which serves one hundred and ten thousand passengers daily, also contemplated the construction of a shopping center and connection exits with España and  avenues, as well as the reconstruction, on the surface, of the Paseo de los Héroes Navales. In 2008 the construction of the tunnels that replace the mixed pedestrian zone were carried out.

Surroundings
The park forms one of the largest and busiest public spaces in the city, and is surrounded by important buildings on all sides. Among them are:

Sculptures
On April 24, 2018, the sculptures of Paseo Colón were part of the ninety-one sculptures declared Cultural Heritage of the Nation by the Ministry of Culture: On February 4, 2022, after recovery work on the promenade, the ten new busts were unveiled in a ceremony presided over by the mayor of Lima Jorge Muñoz Wells and the general commander of the Peruvian Navy, .

See also
Plaza Mayor de Lima
Plaza San Martín, Lima
Paseo de los Héroes Amazónicos

References

Squares in Lima
War of the Pacific